The 2020 NHL Stadium Series was an outdoor regular season National Hockey League (NHL) game, part of the Stadium Series of games that took place on February 15, 2020. The game featured the Los Angeles Kings and the Colorado Avalanche at Falcon Stadium, located on the campus of the U.S. Air Force Academy in Colorado Springs, Colorado. The Kings defeated the Avalanche by a score of 3–1. This was the only game in the Stadium Series that has been scheduled so far for the 2019–20 season (as opposed to multiple games in 2014 and 2016).

The United States Air Force Academy's a cappella group and America's Got Talent Season 12 semi-finalist In The Stairwell performed the anthem prior to puck drop while country music artist Sam Hunt performed during the first intermission.

Background
This was the second time the Avalanche have hosted the Stadium Series, as they last hosted the event in 2016 at Coors Field, as well as the second time a military academy has hosted the Stadium Series, after Navy–Marine Corps Memorial Stadium hosted the 2018 event. Also, this was the Kings' third NHL outdoor regular season game, following the 2014 and 2015 Stadium Series. This  marks their second as the visiting team.

Traffic issues
Due to traffic issues getting into Falcon Stadium during that day, a number of fans ended up missing large portions of the game. Both the league and the Air Force Academy had sent out traffic advisories throughout the week beforehand. But several accidents, and lane closures on Interstate 25 for emergency pothole repairs combined with delays getting through security at the academy's two main gates turned what is normally about a 45-minute drive from Denver to over four hours. A fatal accident then occurred after the game at the north gate, causing all vehicles to be rerouted through the south gate. The academy later issued a statement saying that it did all it could to ease the congestion, but "despite our best efforts, all of these, added to the already challenging traffic conditions along the I-25 corridor, combined and unfortunately impacted some fans travelling to the game". In addition, fans complained about long waits and shortages of food and apparel at the Academy as well.

Game summary
The Los Angeles Kings defeated the Colorado Avalanche 3–1, with Kings forward Tyler Toffoli recording the first hat trick in an NHL outdoor game. Toffoli opened up the scoring at 14:01 of the first period. Colorado defenseman Samuel Girard tied the game less than a minute left in the second period. Toffoli then scored the game-winning goal with 55 seconds left and then added an empty-net goal with five seconds remaining. Los Angeles goalie Jonathan Quick made 32 saves in the win. Colorado goalie Philipp Grubauer made 14 saves before leaving the game with an injury in the third period, while backup goalie Pavel Francouz made six saves.

Number in parentheses represents the player's total in goals or assists to that point of the season

Team rosters

 Cal Petersen dressed as the back-up goaltender for Los Angeles and did not enter the game.

Scratches
Los Angeles Kings: Derek Forbort, Ben Hutton, Nikolai Prokhorkin
Colorado Avalanche: Mark Barberio, T.J. Tynan

References

Stadium Series
NHL Stadium Series
2020
Los Angeles Kings games
Colorado Avalanche games
NHL Stadium Series
Ice hockey competitions in Colorado Springs, Colorado
United States Air Force Academy
NHL Stadium Series